Boris Daenen (born 22 March 1989), better known by his stage name Netsky, is a Belgian drum and bass producer and musician. The name Netsky is based on the computer virus of the same name.

History
Netsky is an electronic music producer, artist and DJ from Belgium.  He started out producing music of the liquid funk style – drum and bass music with many instrumental layers and frequent vocals. High Contrast's 'Gold Digger' remix was a major influence on him.  

In late 2009, Netsky signed a recording contract with Hospital Records, the same label as other well known liquid artists such as High Contrast and London Elektricity. He also won a nomination as "Best Upcoming Producer" within just months of his first release at the 2010 Drum & Bass Arena Awards.

Hospital Records released Netsky's self-titled debut album on 31 May 2010. His second album, titled '2, was released on 25 June 2012. The album features three singles and a deluxe edition was later released supported by a fourth single, "We Can Only Live Today (Puppy)".

In 2014, Netsky signed to Epic Records / Sony Music under Ultra Music, but with a special A&R arrangement to continue connections with Hospital Records.  His first release with the major was 'Running Low' featuring Beth Ditto in 2014, which hit Number 1 in the charts in Belgium  and Number 21 in the UK Dance Chart. 

His 2015 single 'Rio' Featuring Digital Farm Animals was released in 2015, reached number 4 in the Belgian charts, Number 29 in the UK Dance Charts and has recently been awarded Silver Status by BPI.  The song was featured in the London 2016 New Year's celebrations, and was widely used on coverage throughout the 2016 Rio Olympics with Netsky awarded the honour of being chosen as the musical ambassador to the Belgian Olympic Team.  2015 also saw Netsky awarded the Flemish annual Culture Prize for music - the first time this had been awarded to a DJ and Producer. 

In 2016 he released his third studio album '3' via Epic Record / Sony Music and Ultra Music.  The album went to number 1 in the Belgian charts and he toured it at shows and festivals around the world culminating in a show at Sportpaleis Arena in his hometown of Antwerp in February 2017. 

In 2018 Netsky signed to Republic Records, where he released singles 'Tequila Limonada' Featuring A.Chal , 'Ice Cold'; a collaboration with David Guetta, 'I Don't Even Know You Anymore' Featuring Bazzi and Lil Wayne, 'Snitch' Featuring Aloe Blacc and an EP 'Abbot Kinney' made with super producers Stargate (Rihanna, Jay Z, Coldplay). 

In early 2020, to celebrate the 10th anniversary of his first album release, Netsky released drum & bass album 'Second Nature' featuring collaborations with Becky Hill, Rudimental, Montell 2099 and Hybrid Minds amongst others via Hospital Records. In 2021 Netsky premiered his 'Glasshouse' show with 2 sold out nights at Spark Arena in Auckland, New Zealand. He then went on to bring the Glasshouse to Printworks in London and Lotto Arena in Antwerp in 2022. 

In 2022 Netsky signed to Helix Records where he released 'Barricades' Featuring Rita Ora  which was added to the A List at BBC Radio 2. 

Netsky Live! project
In April 2012, during a Hospitality festival at Brixton Academy, Netsky unveiled his "Netsky LIVE!" project for the first time. Accompanied by a team of live musicians, as well as guest vocalists (of whom have sung on Netsky's catalogue of music), Netsky performs his music as a full band, taking center-stage on keyboards and synthesizers. The band toured the world performing headlining shows around the globe, as well as performing at many international music festivals, such as the Ultra Music Festival in Miami, Coachella Festival, Glastonbury in the UK and Pukkelpop in Belgium. Netsky Live! members'''
Netsky – keyboards, synthesizers, bandleader (2012–present)
BABL – keyboards, synths (2012–2017)
Michael Schack – drums (2012–2017)
Script MC – MC (2012–2017)
Diane Charlemagne – vocals (2012-2015†)
Billie – vocals (2012–2017)

Discography
Studio albums

Extended plays

Singles
As lead artist

As featured artist

Promotional singles

Remixes

Other releases
2009
 Crystal Clear & Netsky – "King of the Stars" [Liq-weed Ganja Recordings]
 Netsky – "Starlight" / "Young and Foolish" [Allsorts]
 Netsky – "Lost in This World" (b/w "Life" by KG) [Talkin Beatz]
 Netsky – "Prisma" / "Tomorrow's Another Day" [Liq-weed Ganja Recordings]
 Netsky – "Hold on to Love" (b/w "Generations (S.P.Y Remix)" by BCee) [Future Retro]
 Netsky – "Everyday" / "Come Back Home" [Liq-weed Ganja Recordings]

2010
 Netsky – "I Refuse" / "Midnight Express" [Spearhead Records]
 Netsky – "Eyes Closed" / "Smile" [Allsorts]
 Netsky – "I Refuse (Shock One Remix)" / "Hold on To Love (Cyantific Remix)" [Spearhead Records]
 Netsky – "Your Way" / "Daydreaming" [Radar Records]
 Mutated Forms & Netsky featuring Sofia Rubina – "Windows" [Allsorts]

Guest appearances
2009
 Strength in Numbers EP (by Crystal Clear) – Netsky – "Come Back Home" [Frontline Records]

2010
 Hospital Mix.Eight (mixed by Logistics) – Netsky – "Memory Lane" [Hospital Records]
 This is Drum + Bass (presented by Hospitality) – Netsky – "Smile" [Hospital Records]
 Sick Music 2 – Netsky – "Memory Lane" [Hospital Records]
 Drum & Bass Arena Anthology – Netsky – "I Refuse" [Hospital Records]

2011
 Fifteen Years of Hospital Records – Netsky – "Secret Agent" [Hospital Records]

2014
 Hospital: We Are 18 – Netsky – "Love Life" [Hospital Records]

2015
 Fast Soul Music'' – Netsky – "Memory Lane" [Hospital Records]

References

Notes

Sources

External links

 
 Netsky's SoundCloud

1989 births
Living people
Belgian dance musicians
Belgian DJs
Belgian techno musicians
Hospital Records artists
Drum and bass musicians
People from Edegem
Electronic dance music DJs